8FM (formerly One FM) is a Malaysian Chinese-language radio station. Initially starting with broadcasts in the Klang Valley, it is now broadcast nationwide. 8FM is owned by Media Prima Berhad.

History 
In 2006, its frequencies were from the former women's radio station called "Wanita FM", which was acquired by Media Prima in 2009. The station was renamed to One FM.

Beginning 4 May 2021, this radio station was simulcast on 8TV daily from 1:30am to 7:00am

Starting 2 August 2021, One FM was renamed to 8FM (based on the 8TV branding).

On March 28, 2022, 8FM will no longer broadcast temporarily through the MYTV platform.

On 25 September 2022, 8FM was ceased broadcast temporarily in Kuantan, Pahang 100.4MHz (likely migrating frequency) and it was replaced by Molek FM on 2 October 2022. Listeners have to tune to 8FM via Audio+ app, 8FM YouTube LIVE streaming, 8FM web streaming or FM 88.1MHz from Gunung Ulu Kali. Although 8FM Kuantan frequency 100.4MHz is replaced by Molek FM, but 8FM can be tuned on 88.1MHz in part of Kuantan with weaker signal.

Frequency

See also 
List of radio stations in Malaysia
Fly FM
Hot FM
Buletin FM
Molek FM

References

External links 
 

2009 establishments in Malaysia
Radio stations established in 2009
Radio stations in Malaysia
Chinese-language radio stations in Malaysia
Media Prima